The Souths Cares program is an initiative of the South Sydney Rabbitohs which was started with the aim of to give children and young people from Redfern and the surrounding areas the opportunity to take part in a series of health and education workshops to aid social and physical development and creating a network of committed individuals working together to bring about social change. It is based in Sydney, New South Wales, Australia.

Directors
Current Directors are:
Nicholas Pappas - current Chairman of South Sydney Rabbitohs Football Club and Member Company
Shane Richardson- Current CEO of South Sydney Rabbitohs
James Patterson - Chief Executive, Australia & New Zealand Cushman & Wakefield
Kristina Keneally - former Premier of New South Wales
Harley Broderick- Financial Representative

Financial Record
The last four years have produced the following revenue and delivery to charitable programs:

See also

References

External links
 
 

South Sydney Rabbitohs
Non-profit organisations based in New South Wales
Children's charities based in Australia
Sports charities